Stereoglyphus is a genus of mites in the family Acaridae.

Species
 Stereoglyphus haemisphaericus Berlese, 1923

References

Acaridae